The Socialist Party of Castilla–La Mancha (PSCM-PSOE) is the regional branch in Castilla–La Mancha of the Spanish Socialist Workers' Party (PSOE), the main centre-left party in Spain since the 1970s.

Electoral performance

Cortes of Castilla–La Mancha

Cortes Generales

European Parliament

References

Castilla-La Mancha
Political parties in Castilla–La Mancha
Political parties with year of establishment missing
Social democratic parties in Spain